Die Neue Zeitung ("The New Times", abbreviated NZ) was a newspaper published in the American Occupation Zone of Germany after the Second World War. It was comparable to the daily newspaper Die Welt in the British Occupation Zone and was considered the most important newspaper in post-war Germany.

History
Die Neue Zeitung was first published on 17 October 1945 in Munich and continued publication until 30 January 1955.  The paper was initially published twice weekly, later increasing to six times a week.

Die Neue Zeitung as an American-controlled media outlet
The Information Control Division of the American Occupation Authority acted as publisher of the newspaper. Although the Division allowed German editors and journalists to write, it never gave up ultimate editorial control of the publication. This was made clear in the newspaper's title bar: "Die Neue Zeitung – An American newspaper for the German people."Die Neue Zeitung was considered a means of political re-education for the German population by its American publishers. It was a high quality publication, but after 1949 could not keep up with competition amid the rapid re-growth of the newspaper industry in Germany.

Berlin edition
Starting in early 1947, the American Sector of Berlin had its own separate edition of the NZ. This Berlin edition made sense because in Berlin, the former German capital, the Allied Control Council had strong influence and the interests of the Soviet Union and United States were increasingly at odds. Publication of the NZ in Berlin was seen as necessary to prevent the Sovietization of the Germans there. The NZ in Berlin operated autonomously under the editorship of Marcel Fodor.

The feature section of the Berlin NZ – the so-called Feuilleton, covering literature, art, and culture – was under the direction of Friedrich Luft, long known for his theater reviews in the RIAS ("Rundfunk im amerikanischen Sektor", the radio and TV broadcasting service in the American Sector of Berlin). Hans Schwab-Felisch was another prominent contributor to the Berlin edition's Feuilleton.  Schwab-Felisch later worked at the Frankfurter Allgemeine Zeitung and became editor of Merkur, Germany's leading intellectual review. Other contributors to the Feuilleton included freelancers Will Grohmann (fine arts) and Hans Heinz Stuckenschmidt (music).

Later developments and end of publication
Starting in June 1949 a Frankfurt edition of Die Neue Zeitung was established. In 1951, the Munich and Frankfurt editions were merged into a single Frankfurt edition. After September 1953, the Neue Zeitung appeared only in Berlin. In March 1955, the paper ceased operations entirely.

Contributors
The following are some of the contributors to Die Neue Zeitung.

The author Erich Kästner was senior editor of the feature section (Feuilleton). Robert Lembke, later a television personality, directed the section on domestic politics.

Other prominent contributors include:

 Theodor W. Adorno
 Alfred Andersch
 Heinrich Böll
 Bertolt Brecht
 Alfred Döblin
 Günter Eich
 Ludwig Erhard
 Max Frisch
 Will Grohmann
 Romano Guardini
 Hildegard Hamm-Brücher
 Hans Habe
 Hermann Hesse
 Stefan Heym
 Wolfgang Hildesheimer
 Karl Jaspers
 Alfred Kerr
 Hermann Kesten
 Elisabeth Langgässer
 Eugen Kogon
 Heinrich and Thomas Mann
 Siegfried Maruhn
 Alexander Mitscherlich
 Martin Niemöller
 Heinz Ohff
 Sigismund von Radecki
 Luise Rinser
 Oda Schaefer
 Franz Joseph Schneider
 Wolf Schneider
 Kurt Schumacher
 Anna Seghers
 Wolf Jobst Siedler
 Hans Wallenberg
 Günther Weisenborn
 Franz Werfel
 Ernst Wiechert
 Carl Zuckmayer

The political cartoonist was Paul Flora.

 Sources 
 Jessica C. E. Gienow-Hecht: Art is democracy and democracy is art: Culture, propaganda, and the Neue Zeitung in Germany. In: Diplomatic History (1999) 23#1, S. 21–43.
 Jessica C. E. Gienow-Hecht. American Journalism as Cultural Diplomacy in Postwar Germany, 1945–1955. Baton Rouge: Louisiana State University Press, 1999.
 Wilfried F. Schoeller (editor): Diese merkwürdige Zeit. Leben nach der Stunde Null. Ein Textbuch aus der „Neuen Zeitung“. (This remarkable time: Life after the Zero Hour. A textbook from the Neue Zeitung.) Frankfurt am Main: Büchergilde Gutenberg, 2005. .
 Irmtraud Ubbens: Amerikanisches Leben als Erfahrung und Erlebnis. Moritz Goldstein schreibt von 1950–1954 für die „Neue Zeitung“. (American Life as Lived Experience: Mortiz Goldstein writes for the Neue Zeitung from 1950–54.) In: Jahrbuch für Kommunikationsgeschichte, Bd. 14. Stuttgart: Franz Steiner 2012, ISSN 1438-4485, S. 152–185.
 Jürgen Wilke (editor): Mediengeschichte der Bundesrepublik Deutschland (History of the Media in the Federal Republic of Germany''), Bundeszentrale für politische Bildung Schriftenreihe, Band 361, Bonn 1999.

References

Daily newspapers published in Germany
German-language newspapers
Mass media in Frankfurt
Newspapers published in Berlin
Newspapers published in Munich
Newspapers established in 1945
Publications disestablished in 1955